Pristimantis bogotensis, also known as the Bogota robber frog, is a species of frog in the family Strabomantidae. It is endemic to Colombia where it is only known from the Cundinamarca Department including the Bogotá area, on the Cordillera Oriental.
Its natural habitats are tropical moist montane forests and high-altitude páramo grassland, but it adapts to disturbance and can also occur on pastureland, provided that some shrubs remain.

References

bogotensis
Endemic fauna of Colombia
Amphibians of Colombia
Amphibians of the Andes
Páramo fauna
Amphibians described in 1863
Taxa named by Wilhelm Peters
Taxonomy articles created by Polbot